Pieces, Part One is the fifth studio album by Korean hip-hop group Epik High, released on April 17, 2008. A repackaged version of the album was released with a remix version of "Love Love Love".

Track listing

2008 albums
Epik High albums
Woollim Entertainment albums